The Ford small-block (aka Windsor V8) is a series of 90° overhead valve  small block V8 automobile engines manufactured by the Ford Motor Company from July 1961 to December 2000. 

Designed as a successor to the Ford Y-block engine, it was first installed in the 1962 model year Ford Fairlane and Mercury Meteor.

This engine was installed in several of the company's most famous products, notably the Mustang, as well as the Mercury Cougar, Ford Torino, Ford  Granada, Mercury Monarch, Ford LTD, Mercury Marquis, Ford Maverick and Ford F-150 pickup.

For the 1991 model year, Ford began phasing in their new Modular V8 engine to replace the small-block, beginning with the Lincoln Town Car and continuing through the 1990s. The 2001 Explorer SUV was the last North American installation of the engine, and Ford Australia used it through 2002 in the Falcon and Fairlane.

Although sometimes called the "Windsor" by enthusiasts, Ford never used that designation for the engine line as a whole; it was only adopted informally well into its run to distinguish the  version from the  "Cleveland" version of the  335-family engine that had the same displacement but a significantly different configuration. The designations for each were derived from the original locations of manufacture: Windsor, Ontario and Cleveland, Ohio.

From 1962 through the 1990s these engines were marinized by various companies (255ci/4.2L excepted).

The small block remains available for purchase from Ford Performance Parts as a crate engine.

Overview
The small-block engine was introduced in the 1962 Ford Fairlane and Mercury Meteor cars. Displacing , it was designed to save weight, using thin-wall casting with a block that does not extend below the centerline of the crankshaft. The engine uses a separate aluminum timing chain cover, which differentiates it from the later 335-series Cleveland engines that use an integrated timing cover. All Ford Small Block engines use two-valve-per-cylinder heads, with "2V" and "4V" designations indicating the number of barrels (or venturi) in the carburetor. The valves are in-line and use straight six-bolt valve covers. Coolant is routed out of the block through the intake manifold.

Two additional displacements were produced during the engine's history. A  model was offered beginning in 1969 and continuing until 1996. The 351W (so identified to distinguish from the 335-series Cleveland 351C) uses a taller block than the other engines in the series to avoid excessively short connecting rods. And for a brief time in the early 1980s a version with a smaller bore diameter that displaced  was produced as Ford struggled with emissions and fuel economy.

In response to the Chevrolet Camaro's success in the SCCA Trans-Am Series, Ford engineers developed a new racing engine from the small block. The first attempt mated a tunnel-port head to a 289 cu in block, but the displacement proved to be too small to deliver the desired power. The next iteration of the engine mated an improved head design to the 302 cu in block, producing the famous "Boss 302". The heads from the Boss 302 became the production heads on the 335-series Cleveland engines, which used the same bore spacing and head bolt configuration as the small block engines.

As the 1980s drew to a close, Ford began the design of a new OHC V8 to replace the venerable small block design. The Modular 4.6 L OHC V8 debuted in the 1991 Lincoln Town Car, signaling the eventual demise of the OHV Ford Small Block. Through the rest of the decade, Ford gradually shifted V8 applications to the Modular engine, with the Mustang transitioning in 1996. Even as the small block neared the end of its life, development continued, with new cylinder heads introduced for the Ford Explorer in 1997. American sales in new vehicles ended with the 2001 Ford Explorer, but the engine continues to be offered for sale as a crate engine from Ford Racing and Performance Parts.

Design changes
All of the July 1961 through August 1964 221-260-289 engines used a five-bolt bell housing, with all 221s and 260s being of this configuration, but the 289 changed to the six-bolt arrangement at this time - the change was made due to transmission utilization issues i.e. the need for larger-diameter clutches, for example.

The block mount pads and the cylinder wall contour of the 221 and 260 engines changed in January–February 1963 with the introduction of the 289 variant – all 221 and 260 engine blocks up to this time featured 'corrugated wall' construction with two freeze plugs on the side of each bank and engine mount hole pitch distances of 6 inch.

All three block variants from this point on featured the straight wall method of construction, three freeze plugs and an engine mount hole pitch distance of seven inches. The corrugated wall method of block construction had caused cleaning difficulties in the foundry from day one and a change was phased in.

221

An advanced, compact, thinwall-casting design, it was 24 in wide, 29 in long, and 27.5 in tall (610 mm × 737 mm × 699 mm). It weighed only 470 lb (210 kg) dry despite its cast iron construction, making it the lightest and the most compact V8 engine of its type of the era.

In stock form, it used a two-barrel carburetor and a compression ratio of 8.7:1, allowing the use of regular (rather than leaded) gasoline. Valve diameters were 1.59 in (40.4 mm) (intake) and 1.388 in (35.3 mm) (exhaust).

The 221 was phased out end of May 1963 due to a lack of demand after about 371,000 had been produced.

260

The second version of the Fairlane V8 was given the name Challenger, and was introduced during the middle of the 1962 model year (March 1962). Compression ratio was raised fractionally to 8.8:1. The engine was slightly heavier than the 221, at 482 lb (219 kg).

For the 1962 and 1963 car model years, the valve head diameters remained the same as the 221, but for the 1964 car model year, they were enlarged to 1.67 in (42.4 mm) (intake) and 1.45 in (36.8 mm) (exhaust) – this was an economy measure so that both 260 and 289 engines could use the same valves. Rated power was not changed.

In 1963, the 260 became the base engine on full-sized Ford sedans. Later in the model year, its availability was expanded to the Ford Falcon and Mercury Comet. The early "1964½" Ford Mustang also offered the 260, although it was dropped at the end of the 1964 car model year.

Ford ceased production of the 260 at the end of the 1964 car model year with approximately 604,000 units having been made.

XHP-260
The special rally version of the Falcon and Comet and early AC Cobra sports cars of 1962 used a high-performance version of the 260 with higher compression, hotter camshaft timing, upgraded connecting rods, valves with larger diameter valve stems, stronger valve springs and a four-barrel carburetor. This engine was termed the HP-260 by Ford and was specifically made for Carroll Shelby – about 100 were made.

Sunbeam Tiger
The 1964–1966 Sunbeam Tiger Mk I used the 260.

The 1967 Sunbeam Tiger Mk II used the 289 ci in V8 when the 'build ahead' stocks of the 260 ran out.

289

The  was also introduced in April 1963 and was also called the Challenger V8. Stroke remained at 2.87 inches. The 289 weighed 506 lb (230 kg).

In 1963, The two-barrel 289 replaced the 260 as the base V8 for full-sized Fords.

D-code

The engine was an option on the 1965 Ford Mustang and was known as the "D-code" from the letter code used to identify the engine in the VIN.

The D-code engine is relatively rare, as it was only offered as an optional engine in the latter half of the 1964 model year.

Cyclone
This engine was marketed in the 1964 Mercury Comet Cyclone as the "Cyclone" and carried a K-code in its VIN. This engine is not the same engine as the HiPo K-code engine offered in Ford vehicles.

C-Code

A-Code

The 289-4V was also the engine for the first Australian Ford Falcon GT, the XR Falcon GT.

Production Numbers
Around 3,500,000 289-2V and 289-4V engines were made at Cleveland Engine Plant 1 (CEP1) in 1963-1967 and 800,000 289-2V at Windsor Engine Plant 1 (WEP1).

289 HiPo (K-code)

A high-performance version of the Challenger 289 engine was introduced late in the 1963 model year as a special order for Ford Fairlanes. The engine is informally known as the HiPo or the K-code' (after the engine letter used in the VIN of cars so equipped). Oddly, this engine was introduced in 1963 as the only 289 engine available in the intermediate Fairlanes. Lesser-powered cars had the 260 engine in that year. Starting in June 1964, it became an option for the Mustang.

The HiPo engine was engineered to increase performance and high-RPM reliability over standard 289 fare. It had solid lifters with hotter cam timing; 10.5:1 compression; a dual point, centrifugal advance distributor; smaller combustion chamber heads with cast spring cups and screw-in studs; low-restriction exhaust manifolds; and a bigger, manual-choke 595 CFM carburetor (the standard 289-4V was 480 CFM). The water pump, fuel pump, and alternator/generator pulleys were altered, fewer vanes, extra spring, and larger diameter, respectively; to help handle the higher engine speeds. Even the HiPo's fan was unique. Bottom-end improvements included a flaw-free selected standard block, thicker main bearing caps and crankshaft damper/balancer, larger-diameter rod bolts, a crankshaft made from 80% nodular iron as opposed to the regular items at 40%, all were checked for correct 'nodularity' by polishing an area of the rear counterweight and comparing that surface using a magnification arrangement against a picture datum, increased crankshaft counterweighting to compensate for the heavier connecting rod big ends, the increased external counter weighting at the front was split between the crankshaft damper and a supplementary counterweight place adjacent to the front main bearing journal (all designed to reduce the 'bending moment' in the crankshaft at high-rpm), all for high-rpm reliability.

The K-code HiPo engine was an expensive option and its popularity was greatly diminished after the 390 and 428 big-block engines became available in the Mustang and Fairlane lines, which offered similar power (at the expense of greater weight) for far less cost.

GT-350
The Shelby engine also had a larger oil pan with baffles to reduce oil starvation in hard cornering. Shelby also replaced the internal front press-in oil gallery plugs with a screw-in type plug to reduce chances of failure.

Production numbers

About 25,000 K-code 289's were manufactured at Cleveland Engine Plant 1 (CEP1) between March 1963 and June 1967.

302 4-Bolt Main bearing caps

GT-40

Ford designed a new 302 block for the 1967 GT-40, due to a new regulation which limited engine displacement to 5.0 litres. Ford was able to arrive at the 302 displacement by an extra eighth-inch of piston travel to the 289 Hi-Performance V8. The block featured heavy-duty, four-bolt main bearing caps and pressed in freeze plugs. This engine was topped with Gurney-Weslake aluminum heads. About 50 blocks were made.

Trans-Am 302

Ford's new 302 "Tunnel-Port" engine was originally envisioned as the secret weapon for the 1968 Trans-Am season, which would bring them a third Championship win.

Starting with a 1967 GT-40 block, Ford topped the engine with a new head design. The new heads were based on the design of Ford's NASCAR 427 heads. The intake ports were straight, instead of snaking around the push rods. The push rods actually went through the center of the ports (thus the name "Tunnel-Port"). This configuration also enabled larger valves to be used.

The 302 tunnel-port motor was topped off with an aluminum dual quad intake.

Shelby dyno sheets showed this engine was capable of producing horsepower in the 440 to 450 range, and operated through a very high rpm band (8000+).

Boss 302

The Boss 302 was a performance variant of the small block, inspired by chief engineer Bill Gay and enacted by Bill Barr. A strong bottom end, thicker cylinder walls, steel screw-in freeze plugs, race-prepared crank, special HD connecting rods, and Cleveland-style forged pistons kept the engine together at high speeds. The key to this engine's power was the large-port, large-valve, quench-chambered, free-flowing heads. The Boss 302 Mustang was offered only for the 1969 and 1970 model years. In the January 2010 issue of Hot Rod magazine, a Boss 302 engine built to the exact specifications, settings, and conditions of the original engine was tested. It produced 372 hp at 6,800 rpm and 325 lb-ft of torque at 4,200 rpm.

302

Also, a 302 cu in 335-series engine 302 Cleveland was produced by Ford Australia for the Australian market.

By 1967, the Ford GT40 MKII and GT40 MKIV had dominated the Le Mans 24-Hour Race for two consecutive years, using various versions of the Ford big-block engine. In an attempt to reduce the high speeds, the organizers of this race capped the engine capacity in 1968. Ford consequently returned to the MKI GT40 (originally using the Windsor 289), but had now increased its capacity to meet the new rules. Since Ford had ruled that the GT40 engines must have a direct link back to its production cars, the 302 was adopted in domestic manufacturing.

The connecting rods were shortened to allow the use of the same pistons as the 289. It replaced the 289 early in the 1968 model year.

The most common form of this engine used a two-barrel carburetor, initially with 9.5:1 compression.

The 302 was manufactured in Windsor from 1968 to 1978. Ten years of manufacture was punctuated by several design changes, some small or larger. In 1970, the manufacturing of the engine was moved from Windsor, Ontario to Cleveland, Ohio. Along with the move came most changes that stayed with it for the remainder of its life. These were longer valve stems with rotating lash caps, bottle neck type rocker studs for a positive stop nut arrangement and a longer pushrod to correct valve train geometry. The water pump borrowed from the 351 Cleveland, with a few minor alterations to the casting, allowed the use of a left hand water inlet. (this improved water circulation in the radiator to a more cross-flow direction). This change also necessitated the need for a harmonic damper change to move the timing marks to the other side of the front timing cover and a change to four bolts holding the crank pulley rather than just three.

Until fuel injection began to appear in the 1980s, net power ratings did not rise above .

Ford may have used the "5.0" moniker to distinguish the 302 from their  inline six, which was known as the 4.9. Despite its advertised displacement, Car and Driver'' referred to the 302 as a 4.9-liter engine, though in common usage it is typically called a "5-Oh, 5-Point-Oh, 5 Liter, or 302".

Throttle-body fuel injection became available on the 1980 Lincoln Continental, and became standard on all non-H.O. 5.0 engines for 1983. For the 1986 model year, Ford replaced the throttle-body system with sequential multi-port fuel injection, identifiable by the large intake with an "EFI 5.0" badge on top.

1966–1970 Ford Fairlane (Americas)
1966–1970 Ford Falcon (North America)
1968–1995 Ford Mustang
1968–1974 Ford Galaxie
1968–1997 Ford E series
1968–1986 Ford LTD (Americas)
1969–1991 Ford Country Squire
1969–1974 Ford Torino
1969–1996 Ford F-Series
1969–1996 Ford Bronco
1971–1977 Ford Maverick
1972–1979 Ford Ranchero
1975–1980 Ford Granada (North America)
1977–1981, 1983–1988, 1991–1993 Ford Thunderbird
1977–1979 Ford LTD II
1978–1979 Ford Fairmont
1978–1991 Ford LTD Crown Victoria
1996–2001 Ford Explorer
1968–1969 Mercury Cyclone
1968–1976 Mercury Montego
1969–1991 Mercury Colony Park
1969–1977 Mercury Comet
1975–1980 Mercury Monarch
1968, 1977–1981, 1983–1988, 1991–1993 Mercury Cougar
1979–1986 Mercury Capri
1983–1991 Mercury Grand Marquis
1979–1986 Mercury Marquis
1997–2001 Mercury Mountaineer
1977–1980 Lincoln Versailles
1980, 1982–1987 Lincoln Continental
1980–1983 Continental Mark VI
1984–1985 Continental Mark VII
1986–1992 Lincoln Mark VII
1981–1990 Lincoln Town Car
1989-2003 Laforza

GT-350

For 1968 only, a special high-performance version of the 302 was offered for the Shelby GT350. The main features included: an angled, high-rise aluminum or iron intake manifold, a larger Holley four-barrel carburetor, and bigger valves of  intake and  exhaust. It had a longer-duration camshaft, still with hydraulic lifters. The heads had special close-tolerance pushrod holes to guide the pushrods without rail rocker arms or stamped steel guide plates. The combustion chambers also featured a smaller quench design for a higher compression ratio and enhanced flow characteristics. Additionally, high-flow cast exhaust manifolds similar to those on the 289 Hi-Po K-code engine further improved output. Heavy-duty connecting rods with high-strength bolts and a nodular iron crankshaft were also included in this package.

The package, which cost $692 including some other equipment, was not popular and did not return for 1969. This engine was not a factory engine. Rather, like all Shelby Mustang engines, it was modified by Shelby American in their capacity as a vehicle upfitter. This special engine is well documented in the Ford factory engine repair manual for 1968 Mustangs and Fairlanes.

The block was made in Mexico. "Hecho en Mexico" casting marks are present in the lifter valley, and its main strength was the appearance of much larger and stronger two-bolt main bearing caps on the engine's bottom end - the same as the HiPo-289, but not made from nodular iron rather Ford's standard material. The Mexican 302 block was produced through to the mid-1990s and even showed up in Ford cars, trucks, and vans throughout the 1970s and early 1980s (Mexican-made 302 engines were often used by the USA car plants when CEP1 could not produce enough engines and many Ford replacement engines were Mexican). Mexican blocks were not made from a high-nickel content material as is generally thought, but rather Ford's usual ACB specification material. They are no stronger than any other USA-made component and the bore service life is generally lower due to less wear-resistant South American-sourced iron ore. All Mexican V8 blocks were cast and machined to accept a front engine mount as required for their truck applications.

255

In the late 1970s an urgent need to meet EPA CAFE standards led to the creation of the  version for the 1980 model year, essentially a 302 with the cylinder bores reduced to 3.68 in (93.5 mm). The 302 was to be phased out and the 255 was to be an interim engine which would remain until the new V6 was in production - a quick fix. Rated power (SAE net) was 115-122 hp (86-91 kW), depending on year and application. Cylinder heads, which were specific to this engine, used smaller combustion chambers and valves, and the intake ports were oval whereas the others were all rectangular. The only externally visible clue was the use of an open-runner intake manifold with a stamped-steel lifter valley cover attached to its underside, reminiscent of previous-generation V8 engines, such as the Y-block and the MEL.

It was optional in Fox-chassis cars including the Mustang and corporate cousin Mercury Capri, Thunderbird, Fairmont, and standard equipment in the Ford LTD. Some variants (i.e. Mercury Grand Marquis) were fitted with a variable-venturi carburetor which were capable of highway fuel economy in excess of 27 MPG. Due to its dismal overall performance the 255 was dropped at the end the 1982 car model-year with 253,000 units manufactured - 302 production continued and the plans to phase it out were dropped.

Applications:
1980–1981 Ford Fairmont
1981-1982 Ford F-100
1981–1982 Ford Granada
1981–1982 Ford LTD
1980–1982 Ford Mustang
1980–1982 Ford Thunderbird
1980–1982 Mercury Capri
1980–1982 Mercury Cougar
1981–1982 Mercury Marquis
1980–1981 Mercury Zephyr

5.0 H.O.

The 1982 model year brought a new 5.0 High Output variation. Manual-transmission equipped Mustangs and Mercury Capris were first equipped with two-barrel carburetors (1982), then a four-barrel Holley carburetor (1983–85). The block was fitted with revised, taller lifter bosses to accept roller lifters, and a steel camshaft in 1985, and electronic sequential fuel injection was introduced in 1986. While sequential injection was used on the Mustang beginning in 1986, many other vehicles, including trucks, continued to use a batch-fire fuel injection system. The speed-density based EFI systems used a large, two-piece, cast-aluminum manifold. It was fitted on all engines through 1988, after which year it was phased out for a mass-air type measuring system in most applications (non-California compliant Panther platform cars retained the speed-density system until the Lincoln Town Car received the Modular V8 for model year 1991, and the Crown Victoria and Grand Marquis for 1992).

The same manifold was used in MAF applications, with the addition of the MAF sensor in the air intake tube. The MAF system continued, with minor revisions, until the retirement of the engine in 2001. Ford offered a performance head that was a stock part on 1993–1995 Mustang Cobra models and pre-1997 ½ Ford Explorers and Mercury Mountaineers equipped with the 5.0 L engine called the GT-40 head (casting ID F3ZE-AA). In mid-1997, the Explorer and Mountaineer 5.0 L heads were revised and renamed GT40P. The GT40P heads, unlike the GT40 heads, had a very well-developed port shape/design which yielded about 200 cfm on the intake side and 140 cfm on the exhaust side without increasing the size of the ports at all from standard E7TE castings, and without increasing the exhaust valve size. They also had smaller 59-61 cc combustion chambers for added compression, and the combustion chamber shape was revised to put the spark plug tip near the center of the chamber for a more even burn. These GT40P heads are considered by many enthusiasts to be extremely efficient.

The 302 remained a mainstay of various Ford cars and trucks through the late '90s, although it was progressively replaced by the 4.6 L Modular engine starting in the early 1990s. The last 302 engine was produced for installation in a production vehicle at Cleveland Engine Plant #1 in December 2000, as part of a build-ahead to supply Ford of Australia, which installed their last such engine in a new vehicle in August 2002. The 302 is still available as a complete crate motor from Ford Racing Performance Parts.

Applications:
1982–1995 Ford Mustang
1982–1986 Mercury Capri
1984-1985 Ford Sierra XR8 (South Africa)
1987–1992 Lincoln Mark VII (1987 LSC models only)
1991-1993 Ford Thunderbird 
1991-1993 Mercury Cougar
1991-2002 Ford Falcon 
1991-2002 Ford Fairlane/Ford LTD
1996–2001 Ford Explorer
1997–2001 Mercury Mountaineer

5.6

In 2001, Ford Australia also built some stroked, 5.6 L (5,605 cc, 342 cu in) Windsors with reworked GT40P heads (featuring larger valves), a unique eight-trumpet inlet manifold fitted with a unique throttle body, long-throw crank, H-beam rods, and roller rockers. Used in vehicles known as “T” series Ford Falcons and XR8 Pursuit 250 in their last collaboration (and possibly the last production use of the Windsor small block) in 2001-2002. Vehicles fitted with these stroker engines were sold under the banner of, and only available from dealers under the FTE banner (Ford Tickford Experience). They were produced in conjunction with long standing performance partner Tickford.

Truck 302

The Truck Division instigated a pushrod-operated four-valve-per-cylinder, cylinder head conversion in the early 1990s as a means of modernizing/improving and furthering the service life of the Windsor engine. This work was done for Ford by Roush Industries (for US$1 million) and two 302ci/5.0L and one 351ci/5.8 L variants were built and tested. These engines were highly successful, but upper management refused to allow engines so equipped to go into production, stating that to use a cast iron block in a new car (though the 302 remained an engine option in Explorers through MY2001) was no longer acceptable. One of the 5.0 L engines is in use in a hot rod. Various aftermarket manufacturers have also produced four-valve heads for the 302, notably Dominion Performance and Arao Engineering.

Marine 302
The 302 was marinized and offered in both standard and reverse-rotation setups.

351W

The 351W (Windsor) is often confused with the 351 Cleveland, which is a different engine of identical displacement.
The  Windsor featured a 1.3 in (32.5 mm) taller deck height than the 302, allowing a stroke of 3.5 in (88.9 mm). Although very much related in general configuration to the 289-302 and sharing the same bell housing, motor mounts, and other small parts, the 351W had a unique, tall-deck block, larger main bearing caps, thicker, longer connecting rods, and a distinct firing order (1-3-7-2-6-5-4-8 versus the usual 1-5-4-2-6-3-7-8, a means to move the unacceptable 'noise' of the consecutive firing adjacent front cylinders to the more rigid rear part of the engine block all while reducing excessive main bearing load), adding some 25 lb (11 kg) to the engine's dry weight. The distributor is slightly different, so as to accommodate a larger oil pump shaft and larger oil pump. Some years had threaded dipstick tubes.

It had a unique head which optimized torque over high-rpm breathing, frequently replaced by enthusiasts with aftermarket heads providing better performance. The early 1969 and 1970 heads had larger valves and ports for better performance. The head castings and valve head sizes from 1969 to 1976 were different, notably in passages for air injection and spark plug diameters (1969-1974 18 mm, 1975 and up 14 mm). From 1977 onward, the 351W shared the same head casting as the 302, differing only in bolt hole diameters (7/16 inch for 302, 1/2 inch for 351W). Early blocks (casting ID C9OE-6015-B) had enough metal on bearing saddles 2, 3, and 4 for four-bolt mains, and as with all small-block Fords (SBFs), were superior in strength to most late-model, lightweight castings. Generally, the 1969 to 1974 blocks are considered to be far superior in strength than the later blocks, making these early units some of the strongest and most desirable in the entire SBF engine family including the 335-series. During the 1980s, a four-barrel version (intake manifold casting ID E6TE-9425-B) was reintroduced for use in light trucks and vans. In 1988, fuel injection replaced the four-barrel carburetor. Roller camshaft/lifters were introduced in this engine in 1994.

The original connecting rod beam (forging ID C9OE-A) featured drilled oil squirt bosses to lubricate the piston pin and cylinder bore and rectangular-head rod bolts mounted on broached shoulders. A number of fatigue failures were attributed to the machining of the part, so the bolt head area was spot-faced to retain metal in the critical area, requiring the use of 'football head' bolts. In 1975, the beam forging (D6OE-AA) was updated with more metal in the bolt-head area. The oil squirt bosses were drilled for use in export engines, where the quality of accessible lubricants was questionable. The rod cap forging remained the same on both units (part ID C9OE-A). In 1982, the design of the Essex V6 engine used a new version of the 351W connecting rod (E2AE-A), the difference between the two parts was that the V6 and V8 units were machined in metric and SAE units, respectively. The cap featured a longer boss for balancing than the original design.

The block underwent some changes since its inception. In 1971, deck height was extended from 9.480 in to 9.503 in (casting D1AE-6015-DA) to lower the compression ratio to reduce NOx emissions without the need to change piston or cylinder-head design. In 1974, a boss was added on the front of the right cylinder bank to mount the air injection pump (casting D4AE-A). In 1974, the oil dipstick tube moved from the timing case to the skirt under the left cylinder bank near the rear of the casting. These details made swapping older blocks from passenger cars with front sump oil pans to more recent rear-sumped Mustang and LTD/Crown Vic Ford cars more difficult unless an oil pan had the dipstick mounted therein. In 1984, the rear main seal was changed from a two-piece component to a one-piece design.

When Ford switched to net power ratings in 1972, it was rated at 153 to 161 hp (114 to 120 kW), although actual, installed horsepower was only fractionally lower than in 1971. Around 8.6 million 351W engines were manufactured between 1969 and 1996 at the Windsor Engine Plant Number One.

During the 1990s, motor enthusiasts were modifying 351 Cleveland 2V cylinder heads (by rerouting the coolant exit from the block surfaces to the intake manifold surfaces) for use in the 351W, resulting in the Clevor (combining Cleveland and Windsor). This modification required the use of custom pistons by reason of differing combustion chamber terrain (canted valves vs. straight valves) and intake manifolds. This combination yielded the horsepower potential of the 351C with the ruggedness of the 351W small block and was possible because more 351C 2V cylinder heads were manufactured than the corresponding engine blocks (the 351M and 400 used the same head as the 351C 2V).

The 5.8 L, 351W, was changed during the '90s from speed density to MAF; performance gains were directly affected. Before 1994, the 5.8 L was equipped with speed density. This programmed coding was placed into the vehicle's computer to tell the motor how much air it should be getting, therefore supplying an appropriate amount of fuel. However, if modifications are made to increase air flow, the computer does not provide more fuel until the oxygen sensors register a lean burn and only then can the computer compensate fuel trim. After 1994, the engine was changed to mass air flow (MAF). This allowed the computer to directly read how much air the engine was receiving through the help of a sensor in the air intake as long as that exact sensor was used (MAF sensors cannot be upgraded for increased flow without using an aftermarket chip or ECU). The rest of the intake system can be modified in any number of ways, but generally the MAF sensor remains stock). Because the computer reads this, it is able to increase the amount of fuel the engine gets when the air flow is increased, thus increasing performance. 

Applications:
1969–1974 Ford Galaxie
1969–1970 Ford Mustang
1969–1971 Mercury Cougar
1969–1991 Ford Country Squire
1969-1970 Ford Fairlane (Americas)
1970–1976 Ford Torino
1974–1976 Ford Elite
1975–1996 Ford E series
1977–1979 Ford LTD II
1977–1979 Ford Thunderbird
1979–1996 Ford Bronco
1979–1982 Ford LTD (Americas)
1979–1991 Ford LTD Crown Victoria (After 1982, this engine would only be sold for police sales)
1987–1997 Ford F-Series
1977–1979 Mercury Cougar (station wagons only)
1978, 1986–1991 Mercury Colony Park
1978–1982 Mercury Marquis
1986–1991 Mercury Grand Marquis 
1980 Continental Mark VI
1995 Ford Mustang SVT Cobra R

Marine 351
From the late 1960s through the early to mid-1990s, the 351 Windsor had a long history of being marinized by Holman Moody Marine, Redline of Lewiston, ID (now defunct), Pleasure Craft Marine (PCM), and Indmar for use in about every make of recreational boat, including; Correct Craft, Ski Supreme, Hydrodyne, MasterCraft, and Supra inboard competition ski boats. The marine industry's relationship with the 351W platform ended when Ford was unable or unwilling to compete with GM's production of TBI- and MPI-equipped engines in mass quantity. During that time, the recreational marine community's small-block V8 platform of choice shifted to the 350 cu in (5.7L) GM L31 (Vortec 5700) engine series.

Ford Racing
In the 2000s Ford Racing Performance Parts sold two "Boss" crate engines and at least a 351 block:

FR Boss 302
The new Boss 302 engine was unveiled in the 2006 SEMA show.

FR Boss 351W
The 'Racing Boss 351' (not to be confused with the Ford 335 engine Cleveland-based Boss 351) is a crate engine based on the  Ford Windsor engine, but uses Cleveland sized  main bearing journals. Maximum displacements are  stroke and  bore. The resulting displacement is up to 454.38 cubic inches (7445.9 cc, or 7.4 L).

The uncross-drilled block with increased bore capacity became available from the third quarter of 2009. A  Boss 351-based crate engine producing  was available from the first quarter of 2010.

In 2010, the MSRP for the Boss 351 block was US$1,999.

See also
 List of Ford engines

Notes

References

Further reading

External links
 Short descriptions of Ford overhead valve V8 engines

Windsor
V8 engines
History of Windsor, Ontario
Gasoline engines by model